Danielle Sheen is an English former football striker. She played in the FA Women's Premier League National Division for clubs including Liverpool Ladies and Blackburn Rovers Ladies.

Club career
Sheen joined Liverpool Ladies as a junior, scoring on her debut for the senior side in March 2006.

She left Liverpool after their relegation, joining Blackburn Rovers Ladies in July 2009.

Representative career
Sheen was part of the Merseyside girls under-16 squad that won the Northern Inter County title in 2005, scoring the winner in the final against West Yorkshire. She also scored twice as Merseyside drew 2–2 with Hampshire in the National Inter County Final.

Statistics

References

Living people
English women's footballers
Liverpool F.C. Women players
Blackburn Rovers L.F.C. players
FA Women's National League players
1990 births
Women's association football forwards
Leeds United Women F.C. players
Tranmere Rovers L.F.C. players
Footballers from Liverpool